Gyrostipula is a genus of flowering plants in the family Rubiaceae. The genus is found on the Comoros  and Madagascar.

Species
Gyrostipula comorensis 
Gyrostipula foveolata 
Gyrostipula obtusa

References

Rubiaceae genera
Naucleeae